La Spedla (or Punta Perrucchetti) is a minor summit south of Piz Bernina on the border between Italy and Switzerland. With a height of 4,020 metres above sea level, it is the highest summit on the Italian side of the Bernina Range and the highest summit in Lombardy. Because of its small prominence it was included only in the enlarged list of alpine four-thousanders.

See also
 List of Italian regions by highest point

References

External links 
 La Spedla on Hikr
 List of Alpine four-thousanders

Bernina Range
Mountains of Graubünden
Mountains of Lombardy
Mountains of the Alps
Alpine four-thousanders
International mountains of Europe
Italy–Switzerland border
Mountains of Switzerland
Four-thousanders of Switzerland
Samedan
Pontresina